Sir Christopher Jeremy Morse KCMG (10 December 1928 – 4 February 2016) was an English banker, cruciverbalist and chess composer who was Chancellor of the University of Bristol from 1989 to 2003, and was chairman of Lloyds Bank.

Early life and education
Morse was born in 1928, only son (he had a younger sister) of Francis John Morse, of Lenwade House, Norwich, Norfolk, and his wife, Kinbarra, daughter of barrister Edward Armfield-Marrow. Francis John Morse- second son of Sir George Henry Morse, a brewer and Lord Mayor of Norwich from 1922 to 1923- was from a junior branch of the landed gentry Morse family of Lound, Suffolk.

Morse was educated at West Downs School, Winchester College, and New College, Oxford.

Career
A career banker, Morse began with Williams and Glyn's Bank and went on to be chairman of Lloyds Bank between 1977 and 1993. He served on the Board of the Bank of England as an executive director from 1965 to 1972, and as a non-executive from 1993 to 1997. He was also the first Chairman of the International Monetary Fund's Committee of Twenty (C20). In the 1975 New Year Honours, he was appointed Knight Commander of the Order of St Michael and St George (KCMG) "for services to the reform of the international monetary system".

He had a keen interest in cryptic crosswords and was a skilful writer of clues. His record of success in the clue-writing competitions of Ximenes and Azed was such that Azed's December 2008 Competition puzzle was dedicated to the occasion of his eightieth birthday. He had puzzles published under the pseudonym "Esrom" (his surname in reverse).

In addition to crosswords, Morse had an interest in other types of word puzzles, and was a frequent contributor to Word Ways: The Journal of Recreational Linguistics. He was also a chess writer and wrote a book called Chess Problems: Tasks and Records.

Colin Dexter's fictional detective, Inspector Morse, was named after him.

In 2006 Morse was awarded the title of World Federation for Chess Composition Honorary Master.

He was an honorary fellow of New College, Oxford, and of All Souls College, Oxford. He died on 4 February 2016 at the age of 87.

Personal life
In 1955, he married Belinda Marianne, daughter of Lt-Colonel Robert Breynton Yarnton Mills, OBE, MC, of the landed gentry Mills family of Sudgrove; they had three sons and two daughters (one of whom died young). Lady Morse died in 2017.

References

External links 
 
 
 

1928 births
Alumni of New College, Oxford
Chancellors of the University of Bristol
Fellows of All Souls College, Oxford
Fellows of New College, Oxford
2016 deaths
People educated at West Downs School
People educated at Winchester College
Knights Commander of the Order of St Michael and St George
People associated with the Bank of England
English bankers
Crossword compilers
Chess composers
Chairmen of Lloyds Banking Group
British chairpersons of corporations
20th-century English businesspeople